Dinorwic is a Martian impact crater, approximately 56 kilometers in diameter. It is located on the planet Mars at 30.4°S, 101.6°W, northeast of the crater Virrat and north of the crater Tugaske. To the northeast of Dinorwic is the crater Caxias, and farther north is the crater Llanesco. It is named after the town in Ontario, Canada. Its name was approved by the International Astronomical Union in 1991. According to a surface age map of Mars based on US Geological Survey data, the area around Dinorwic is from the Noachian epoch, which places the area's age at 3.8 to 3.5 billion years ago. At the crater's rim, it is about 7,600 meters above zero altitude, and it is about 5,950 meters above zero altitude at its floor, giving it a depth of 1.6 kilometers.

References

Impact craters on Mars
Thaumasia quadrangle